Markovo is a rural locality (a village) in Pekshinskoye Rural Settlement, Petushinsky District, Vladimir Oblast, Russia. The population was 7 as of 2010.

Geography 
The village is located on the Peksha River, 25 km north from Peksha, 32 km north-east from Petushki.

References 

Rural localities in Petushinsky District